Bernhard E. Scholz, (30 March 1835 – 26 December 1916) was a German conductor, composer and teacher of music.

Life 
Bernhard Scholz was born in Mainz in 1835.  He was intended by his father to take over his father's business (Lithographische Druckerei und Verlag Jos. Scholz) and studied to be a printer at Imp. Lemercier in Paris. But music became his career. He was a student of Ernst Pauer (piano) in Mainz, and 1855-56 of Siegfried Dehn (counterpoint) in Berlin. He also took voice lessons with Antonio Sangiovanni in Milan.

He first taught at the Munich Conservatory and was court Kapellmeister in Zürich, Nuremberg and 1859-65 in Hanover. Between 1865 and 1866 he was director of the Cherubini Society in Florence and also taught at the Stern Conservatory and the Kullak Conservatory. From 1871-83 he directed the Orchestra Society in Breslau. In 1883 he was appointed director of the Hoch Conservatory in Frankfurt, a post he held until 1908.

He died in Munich in 1916.

His Piano Concerto was championed by Clara Schumann, who included it in her repertory.

He was one of four signatories to an anti-"Music of the Future" (anti-New-Weimar-School) Manifesto published in the Berliner Musik-Zeitung Echo on 6 May 1860, along with Johannes Brahms (possibly its author), Joseph Joachim and Julius Otto Grimm.

Works 
 Carlo Rosa, opera (1858 in Munich)
 Ziethen'sche Husaren, opera (1869 in Breslau)
 Morgiane, opera (1870 in Munich)
 Golo, opera (1875 in Nürnberg)
 Der Trompeter von Säkkingen, opera (1877 in Wiesbaden)
 Die vornehmen Wirte, opera (1883 in Leipzig)
 Ingo, opera (1898 in Frankfurt)
 Anno 1757, opera (1903 in Berlin)
 Mirandolina, opera (1907 in Darmstadt)
 Choral music with orchestra
 2 symphonies
 Piano concerto in B major, Op. 57 (published 1883)
 2 string quartets
 String quintet
 Piano quartet
 2 piano trios
 3 violin sonatas
 5 cello sonatas
 Piano music
 Lieder

Publications 
 Lehre vom Kontrapunkt und der Nachahmung, 1897
 Wohin treiben wir?, 1897 (a collection of essays)
 Musikalisches und Persönliches, 1899
 Verklungene Weisen, 1911
 Sigfried Dehn: Lehre vom Kontrapunkt, dem Kanon und der Fuge, (Bernhard Scholz, Ed.) 1859/2. Edition: 1883

Footnotes

References 
 Peter Cahn, Das Hoch'sche Konservatorium in Frankfurt am Main (1878–1978), Frankfurt am Main: Kramer, 1979.
 Baker's Biographical Dictionary of Musicians, (Nicolas Slonimsky, Ed.) New York: G. Schirmer, 1958

External links

 The family tree of Bernhard Scholz on Geni.com

1835 births
1916 deaths
Academic staff of the University of Music and Performing Arts Munich
German conductors (music)
German male conductors (music)
Academic staff of Hoch Conservatory
German music educators
German opera composers
Male opera composers
German male classical composers
19th-century German musicians
19th-century German male musicians